Kochetki is a rural locality (a village) in Danilovskoye Rural Settlement, Melenkovsky District, Vladimir Oblast, Russia. The population was 2 as of 2010. There is 1 street.

Geography 
The village is located 30 km south-west from Danilovo, 41 km south-west from Melenki.

References 

Rural localities in Melenkovsky District